Mfundo Nsele is a midfielder who plays for African Warriors F.C. in the South African Premier Soccer League.

References

1985 births
Living people
People from uMngeni Local Municipality
Association football midfielders
AmaZulu F.C. players
South African soccer players
Royal Eagles F.C. players
Lamontville Golden Arrows F.C. players
Bloemfontein Celtic F.C. players
African Warriors F.C. players